G.R. Swaminathan is an Indian Judge of the Madras High court.

Early life 
G.R. Swaminathan was born in 1968. He hails from Thiruvarur. He completed his law degree (B.L.) in Central Law College, Salem and Dr.Ambedkar Government Law College.

Career 
In 1991, he became an advocate. In 1997, he established an independent practice in Puducherry, and in 2004, he relocated to Madurai after the Madras High Court established the Madurai Bench. In 2014, he was chosen as the Assistant Solicitor General of India for the High Court's Madurai Bench. There were allegations that Swaminathan, during his tenure as an Additional Solicitor General, had participated in a programme organised by the Bharatiya Janata Party.

He was Judge of the Madras High Court on 28 June 2017. He was due to retire from service on 31 May 2030. G.R. Swaminathan was appointed as a permanent Judge of the Madras High Court in April 2019.

Politics 
G R Swaminathan was a part of the Hindu Munnani in 2015.

Reception
A lawyer representing Democratic Advocates' Association, wrote to the Madras High Court's Chief Justice in July 2022, requesting the resignation of Swaminathan, who had lauded BJP leader K Annamalai in a court case, based on the premise that the court must be impartial and cannot endorse any political party. The association asserted that Swaminathan's continued position is a threat to the autonomy of the Judiciary as it would instil fear among people to express concerns against the BJP.

References 

Indian judges
Judges of the Madras High Court
1968 births
Living people